Danny Cashman (born 8 January 2001) is an English professional footballer who plays as a forward for Altrincham on loan from Coventry City.

Career
Cashman joined Brighton & Hove Albion in 2012, and captained their under-18 team. On 6 August 2021, he signed for Coventry City, and was immediately loaned to Rochdale.

On 1 September 2022, Cashman returned to EFL League Two to join Walsall on loan until the end of the 2022–23 season.

On 16 January 2023, Cashman returned to Coventry City after being recalled from his loan stay with Walsall. On 31 January, he joined National League club Altrincham until the end of the season.

Career statistics

References

2001 births
Living people
English footballers
Association football forwards
Brighton & Hove Albion F.C. players
Coventry City F.C. players
Rochdale A.F.C. players
Walsall F.C. players
Altrincham F.C. players
English Football League players